Barbara Massalska (1 January 1927 – 20 March 1980) was a Polish artist and teacher at the State High School of Plastic Arts (SHSPA), Gdańsk (now Gdańsk Academy of Fine Arts (:pl:Akademia Sztuk Pięknych w Gdańsku)).

In her youth she took part in the Warsaw uprising as member of the Gray Ranks.

After graduating from the SHSPA in 1953, she continued to work at the school, where she directed the workshops on murals and paintings. Her artistic interests included mosaics, murals, sgraffitos, paintings, and stained glass.

In addition to her paintings being exhibited at national and international exhibitions and held in the collections at the Malbork Castle collection and at the National Museum, Gdańsk, she has  stained glass windows in St Barbara's Church, Gdansk, and St Joseph's Church Gdansk. One of her sgraffito is on No. 26 Long Market: Lady on a horse and musicians, Gdansk.

References

1927 births
1980 deaths
20th-century Polish painters
Polish muralists
Mosaic artists
Stained glass artists and manufacturers
Polish women painters
Women muralists
20th-century Polish women artists
Academic staff of the Academy of Fine Arts in Gdańsk